Torill Fjellestad (born 21 April 1982) is a Norwegian former footballer, who most recently played for Jølster IL of the Second Division. She previously played for Toppserien's IL Sandviken.

She has played one match with the Norwegian national team, a friendly against Japan.

References

1982 births
Living people
People from Gloppen
Norwegian women's footballers
Norway women's international footballers
Toppserien players
SK Brann Kvinner players
Women's association football defenders
Sportspeople from Vestland